In 1979, Elton John toured Israel and the USSR with Ray Cooper. The duo proved successful and they performed concerts together a total of 234 times in ten of the years between 1977 and 2012.

1977 tour

Setlist

1979 tour

Sources:

Setlists

1990 concert

Setlist

 Daniel
 Tonight
 Philadelphia Freedom
 Rocket Man (I Think It's Going to Be a Long, Long Time)
 Sorry Seems to Be the Hardest Word
 Don't Let the Sun Go Down on Me
 Bennie and the Jets
 Candle in the Wind
 Your Song

1993 tour

Sources:

Setlists

1994 tour

Sources:

Setlists

1995 tour

Sources:

Setlists

2009 tour

Sources:

Setlists

2010 tour

Sources:

Cancellations and rescheduled shows

Setlist

2011 tour

Sources:

Cancellations and rescheduled shows

Setlist

2012 tour

Festivals and other miscellaneous performances
This concert was a part of "Monte-Carlo Sporting Summer Festival"
This concert was a part of "Døgnvill Vinter Festival"

Setlists

Box office score data

References

Elton John concert tours
John, Elton